Heinrich Wolf (born 1924, Siegen) is a German entomologist who specialised in Hymenoptera. His collection  is conserved in the Castle Museum in Linz (Landesmuseum Linz).

External links
   Pdf Biography (in German), portrait, complete bibliography. From the website of LandesMuseum Linz

German entomologists
Hymenopterists
1924 births
2004 deaths
20th-century German zoologists
Recipients of the Cross of the Order of Merit of the Federal Republic of Germany